Maksim Kovel (born 12 January 1999) is a Belarusian professional footballer who plays for Isloch Minsk Raion.

Honours
BATE Borisov
Belarusian Cup winner: 2019–20

References

External links 
 
 

1999 births
Living people
Belarusian footballers
Association football defenders
FC BATE Borisov players
FC Sputnik Rechitsa players
FC Arsenal Dzerzhinsk players
FC Smolevichi players
FC Isloch Minsk Raion players